Goat Island is an island located in Lake Worth, in Tarrant County, Texas.

References

Islands of Texas
Landforms of Tarrant County, Texas